Nāmarūpa is used in Buddhism to refer to the constituents of a living being: nāma is typically considered to refer to the mental component of the person, while rūpa refers to the physical.

Nāmarūpa is a dvandva compound in Sanskrit and Pali meaning "name (nāma)  and form (rūpa)".

Nama (name) and Rupa (form) is the simple worldly identity of any form by a name both of which are considered temporal and not true identity with the nameless and formless ‘reality’ or ‘Absolute’ in Hinduism that has manifested as maya. In Buddhism the loss of all names and forms leads to the realization of the Ultimate reality of ‘Shunyatha’ or ‘Emptiness’ or Nirvana “Naked Truth” removed of Maya.

In Buddhism 

This term is used in Buddhism to refer to the constituents of a living being: nāma refers to the mental, while rūpa refers to the physical. The Buddhist nāma and rūpa are mutually dependent, and not separable; as nāmarūpa, they designate an individual being. Namarupa are also referred to as the five skandhas, "the psycho-physical organism", “mind-and-matter,” and “mentality-and-materiality”.

Psycho-physical constituents 
In the Pali Canon, the Buddha describes nāmarūpa in this manner (English on left, Pali on right):

Elsewhere in the Pali Canon, nāmarūpa is used synonymously with the five aggregates.

Empty of self 
In keeping with the doctrine of anātman/anatta, "the absence of an (enduring, essential) self", nāma and rūpa are held to be constantly in a state of flux, with only the continuity of experience (itself a product of dependent origination) providing an experience of any sort of conventional 'self'.

Part of the cycle of suffering 
Nāmarūpa is the fourth of the Twelve Nidānas, preceded by consciousness (Pali: viññāna; Skt.: vijñana) and followed by the six sense bases.  Thus, in the Sutta Nipata, the Buddha explains to the Ven. Ajita how samsaric rebirth ceases:

In Hinduism 

The term nāmarūpa is used in Hindu thought, nāma describing the spiritual or essential properties of an object or being, and rūpa the physical presence that it manifests. These terms are used similarly to the way that 'essence' and 'accident' are used in Catholic theology to describe transubstantiation. The distinction between nāma and rūpa in Hindu thought explains the ability of spiritual powers to manifest through inadequate or inanimate vessels - as observed in possession and oracular phenomena, as well as in the presence of the divine in images that are worshiped through pūja.

Nāma Rupatmak Vishva is the Vedanta (a school of Sanatana Dharma/Hinduism) term for the manifest Universe, viz. The World as we know it. Since every object in this World has a Nāma and Rupa, the World is called Nāma Rupatmak Vishva. The Paramātma (or Creator) is not manifest in this Nāma Rupatmak Vishva but is realized by a Sādhaka(student) by means of Bhakti (devotion), Karma (action), Jnana (knowledge), Yoga (Union, a Hindu school), or a combination of all of these methodologies.

See also 
 Bodymind
 Pratitya-samutpada (Sanskrit; Pali: paticca-samuppāda; English: dependent arising)
 Skandha (Sanskrit; Pali: khandha; English: aggregates)

Notes

References

Bibliography 

 Ireland, John D. (trans.) (1983). Ajita-manava-puccha: Ajita's Questions (Sn 5.1), from The Discourse Collection: Selected Texts from the Sutta Nipata (WH 82). Kandy: Buddhist Publication Society.  Retrieved 2007-06-20 from "Access to Insight" (1994) at https://web.archive.org/web/20140812121236/http://www.accesstoinsight.org/tipitaka/kn/snp/snp.5.01.irel.html.
 Rhys Davids, T.W. & William Stede (eds.) (1921-5). The Pali Text Society’s Pali–English Dictionary. Chipstead: Pali Text Society. A general on-line search engine for the PED is available at http://dsal.uchicago.edu/dictionaries/pali/.
 Sri Lanka Buddha Jayanti Tipitaka Series (SLTP) (n.d.). Buddhavaggo (SN 12.1). Retrieved 2007-06-20 from "METTANET - LANKA" at http://metta.lk/tipitaka/2Sutta-Pitaka/3Samyutta-Nikaya/Samyutta2/12-Abhisamaya-Samyutta/01-Buddhavaggo-p.html.
 Thanissaro Bhikkhu (trans.) (1994). Ajita-manava-puccha: Ajita's Questions (Sn 5.1). Retrieved 2007-06-20 from "Access to Insight" at https://web.archive.org/web/20141226013717/http://www.accesstoinsight.org/tipitaka/kn/snp/snp.5.01.than.html.
 Thanissaro Bhikkhu (trans.) (1997). Paticca-samuppada-vibhanga Sutta: Analysis of Dependent Co-arising (SN 12.2). Retrieved 2007-06-20 from "Access to Insight" at https://web.archive.org/web/20060512063953/http://www.accesstoinsight.org/canon/sutta/samyutta/sn-12-002-tb0.html.

Hindu philosophical concepts
Twelve nidānas
Sanskrit words and phrases